Adigozalov is a surname. Notable people with the surname include:

 Rauf Adigozalov (1940–2002), Azerbaijani violinist and singer
 Telman Adigozalov (1953–2010), Azerbaijani actor and television presenter
 Vasif Adigozalov (1935–2006), Azerbaijani composer
 Zulfu Adigozalov (1898–1963), Azerbaijani singer